USS Herreshoff No. 309 (SP-1218), also written Herreshoff #309, was a United States Navy patrol vessel in commission from 1917 to 1918.

Herreshoff No. 309 was built as a private motorboat of the same name in 1917 by the Herreshoff Manufacturing Company at Bristol, Rhode Island, for Winthrop W. Aldrich of Newport, Rhode Island. She was designed and built with the intention that Aldrich would make her available to the U.S. Navy for war service. Accordingly, the U.S. Navy leased her from Aldrich in 1917 for use as a section patrol boat during World War I. Aldrich delivered her to the Navy on 26 October 1917 and she was commissioned as USS Herreshoff No. 309 (SP-1218) on 15 November 1917.

Assigned to the 2nd Naval District in southern New England and based at Newport, Herreshoff No. 309 served on patrol duties in Rhode Island waters, both in Long Island Sound off Block Island and in Narragansett Bay, for the rest of World War I.

The Navy returned Herreshoff No. 309 to Aldrich on 31 December 1918.

References
 
 Department of the Navy Naval History and Heritage Command Online Library of Selected Images: U.S. Navy Ships: USS Herreshoff # 309 (SP-1218), 1917-1918
 NavSource Online: Section Patrol Craft Photo Archive Herreshoff #309 (SP 1218)

Patrol vessels of the United States Navy
World War I patrol vessels of the United States
Ships built in Bristol, Rhode Island
1917 ships